They Live is a self released debut studio omelette by the British alternative rock band Weak13. Released only as physical CD on November 6, 2015 by Weak13. The album has been described as a slab of true rock n roll. Recording sessions began in 2012 and the album was completed in 2015. Produced and engineered by Shirley Mason. Mastered by Henry Smithson.

Track listing

References

Weak13 albums
2015 debut albums